WCMI-FM (92.7 MHz) is an active rock–formatted radio station licensed to Catlettsburg, Kentucky, United States, and serving the greater Huntington–Ashland metropolitan area. The station is currently owned by 
Huntington, West Virginia–based Kindred Communications as part of a conglomerate with Huntington–licensed ESPN Radio–affiliated sports station WRVC (930 AM), Ashland, Kentucky–licensed ESPN Radio-affiliated sports station WCMI (1340 AM), Ashland–licensed country music station WDGG (93.7 FM), Kenova, West Virginia–licensed adult contemporary station WMGA (97.9 FM), and Gallipolis, Ohio–licensed classic country station WXBW (101.5 FM). All six stations share studios on Fifth Avenue in downtown Huntington.

In addition to its primary signal, WCMI-FM also operates a FM translator on 98.5 FM as W253BB, licensed to Huntington.

History
WCMI-FM went on-the-air in 1972 as WCAK. The station was co–owned by Edgar Kitchen and Hal Murphy under the name K&M Broadcasting.

References

External links
Kindred Communications Website

CMI-FM
Radio stations established in 1972
1972 establishments in Kentucky
Catlettsburg, Kentucky